Stanisław Kowalczewski (22 February 1890 – 18 October 1939) was a Polish sports shooter. He competed in three events at the 1924 Summer Olympics.

References

External links
 

1890 births
1939 deaths
Polish male sport shooters
Olympic shooters of Poland
Shooters at the 1924 Summer Olympics
People from Dąbrowa Górnicza
Sportspeople from Silesian Voivodeship
Recipients of the Cross of Independence
20th-century Polish people